The house at 8 State Street is a historic home located at Mount Morris in Livingston County, New York. It is believed to have been built in the 1850s.  The Italianate style building features cubic massing, a prominent cupola, tripartite projecting bay windows, and a profusion of decorative woodwork.

It was listed on the National Register of Historic Places in 1999.

References

External links
House at No. 8 State Street - Mount Morris, New York - U.S. National Register of Historic Places on Waymarking.com

Houses on the National Register of Historic Places in New York (state)
Italianate architecture in New York (state)
Houses completed in 1850
Houses in Livingston County, New York
National Register of Historic Places in Livingston County, New York